Marcos Luque Martins (born April 8, 1974) is a Brazilian humorist, well known for his performances as a stand-up comedian and as one of the hosts of the Brazilian version for the Argentinian TV program CQC - Caiga Quien Caiga - (Spanish for Whoever might fall), in Portuguese, Custe o que Custar (Whatever it takes).

References

Living people
1974 births
People from São Paulo
Brazilian male comedians
Brazilian people of Spanish descent